The 2022 Rust-Oleum Automotive Finishes 100 was the 16th stock car race of the 2022 ARCA Menards Series season, and the 36th iteration of the event. The race was scheduled to be held on Sunday, September 4, 2022, but due to inclement weather, the race would later be held on Monday, September 5, in Du Quoin, Illinois at The DuQuoin State Fairgrounds Racetrack, a 1 mile (1.6 km) permanent oval-shaped dirt track. The race was decreased from 100 laps to 78 laps, due to inclement weather. In a dominating fashion, Ryan Unzicker, driving for Hendren Motorsports, held off Jesse Love for his second career ARCA Menards Series win, and his first of the season. This was also a special win, as Unzicker's team owner, Bill Hendren, is going to retire after the 2022 season. This was their last scheduled race. To fill out the podium, Sammy Smith, driving for Kyle Busch Motorsports, would finish in 3rd, respectively.

Entry list 

 (R) denotes rookie driver

Practice/Qualifying 
Practice and qualifying were both cancelled to due to inclement weather. It was originally scheduled to be held on Sunday, September 4. The starting lineup would be based on owner points. As a result, Jesse Love, driving for Venturini Motorsports, would earn the pole.

Race results

Standings after the race 

Drivers' Championship standings

Note: Only the first 10 positions are included for the driver standings.

References

External links 

2022 ARCA Menards Series
Rust-Oleum Automotive Finishes 100
2022 in sports in Illinois